Massacre of Ostrówki refers to the mass murder of the Polish inhabitants of the Volhynian village of , located during the interbellum in the gmina Hushcha, Liuboml (Polish: Huszcza, Luboml), Volhynian Voivodeship of the Second Polish Republic, now known as Ostrowky, located in the Manevychi Raion of Volyn, Ukraine. On 30 August 1943, armed members of the Ukrainian Insurgent Army (UIA) murdered 438 Poles. Among the victims were 246 children under the age of 14.

On the same day, the nationalists of the Ukrainian Insurgent Army murdered 529 Poles in the neighboring village of Wola Ostrowiecka (see Massacre of Wola Ostrowiecka). After the massacre, Ostrówki was burned to the ground after its goods were looted. In September 1943, a commandant, surnamed Lysiy, of the local UIA, reported to the UIA's headquarters: "I have carried out the operation in the villages of Wola Ostrowiecka and Ostrovky (sic). I have liquidated all Poles, from the youngest to the oldest ones. I burnt all buildings, and appropriated all goods."

The particulars
The massacres followed a scheme similar to other such events in the area. The village was surrounded by Ukrainians armed with firearms, knives, axes and pitchforks. All Poles were ordered to assemble at a local school, to discuss ways of fighting the Germans. Males were then murdered, followed by women, girls, and then small children. All bodies were then thrown into a pit. Those Poles who remained, were locked in the school, where they either burned alive, or were murdered with grenades.

At some point during the massacre, which began at 10 a.m., 
German soldiers came to investigate the village. Their arrival spurred the murderers to hurry, and a number of women and children were killed in a nearby field. After the Germans  left, the Ukrainians began calling out in Polish that the area was clear. Those who responded to the subterfuge were murdered.

Polish survivors of the massacre and their families organized the first trip to Ostrówki/Ostrowky in 1990. They met with inhabitants of the neighboring Ukrainian village of Sokil, none of whom wished to talk about it. Tomasz Trisiuk, a Polish survivor of the massacre who was 13 at the time, remembered that most of the victims were murdered with hammers and axes. Another survivor, Helena Popek, who was then 20, stated that the UIA at first pretended to be friendly, giving out candy to children and telling the Poles to calm down.

On 17 August 1992, an exhumation took place; Polish scientists of the Medical Academy from Lublin found 330 bodies, which were reburied on 30 August 1992, the 49th anniversary of the massacre, in a local cemetery. In 2003, a metal cross with a small chapel dedicated to Virgin Mary were erected here.

See also
 Historiography of the Massacre of Poles in Volhynia
 Massacres of Poles in Volhynia

References

Further reading
 Roman Mądro, Badania masowych grobów ludności polskiej zamordowanej przez nacjonalistów ukraińskich w roku 1943 w powiecie lubomelskim. Część II - Przebieg i wyniki ekshumacji w Ostrówkach, (w:) Archiwum Medycyny Sądowej i Kryminologii, tom 43, nr 1, Kraków 1993, s. 64-78;
 Wołyński testament, (oprac.) Leon Popek, Tomasz Trusiuk, Paweł Wira, Zenon Wira, Lublin 1997, Towarzystwo Przyjaciół Krzemieńca i Ziemi Wołyńsko-Podolskiej, ;

External links
 Description of the now non-existent village of Ostrówki, with the list of some victims of the massacre , wolyn.ovh.org; accessed 6 December 2014.

World War II crimes in Poland
1943 in Poland
Massacres in 1943
World War II massacres
Poland in World War II
Massacres of Poles in Volhynia
August 1943 events